"Who Needs the Peace Corps?" is a rock and roll song written by American musician Frank Zappa and featured as the second track on the 1968 album We're Only in It for the Money by The Mothers of Invention. 

The lyrics are a satire of the hippie and flower power movements of the era, narrated by an insincere young man who travels to San Francisco for the summer of love: "I will ask the Chamber Of Commerce how to get to Haight Street / And smoke an awful lot of dope". 

The song quickly became dated when the hippie movement faded and was only performed live during the early years of the Mothers of Invention. It was briefly revived in 1988 however, as can be heard on the live album The Best Band You Never Heard in Your Life. On the performance selected for the album, Mike Keneally performs the monologue at the end of the song in a style reminiscent of Johnny Cash's, who was very unlike the hippie portrayed in the song.

The song is also part of the soundtrack of the 1969 film Medium Cool.

Lyrics
The lyrics of "Who Needs the Peace Corps?" mock hippies and people who follow the hippie fashion (such as wearing beads, leather bands and long hair, or "smoking dope") without caring about the social reflections and political views of the concept. It includes a monologue of a stereotypical "phony hippie" who aspires to find a rock band and become their road manager in order to become part of the hippie movement.

In his 2016 book Rock, Counterculture and the Avant-Garde, 1966-1970, Doyle Greene says:
..."Peace Corps" is not necessarily referring to the U.S. government organization, but the "peace and love corps" of the hippie movement. It is a scathing critique of the counter-culture experience as migrating to San Francisco, dressing in hippie fashions, contracting sexually transmitted diseases, getting beat up by police, and high-tailing back home.

References

External links
Lyrics and information
[ Review on allmusic.com]

Songs about hippies
Songs about cannabis
Songs about San Francisco
Songs about police officers
Satirical songs
Experimental rock songs
Frank Zappa songs
1968 songs
Songs written by Frank Zappa
Song recordings produced by Frank Zappa
Protest songs
Songs about police brutality